UniVec is a database that can be used to remove vector contamination from DNA sequences.

See also
 Plasmid
 VectorDB

References

External links
 The UniVec Database. NCBI. Retrieved 7 November 2013.

Biological databases
Mobile genetic elements
Molecular biology techniques